Sophia Catherine Diagne (born 10 November 1998) is a Senegalese swimmer. She competed in the women's 50 metre backstroke at the 2019 World Aquatics Championships held in Gwangju, South Korea. In 2019, she also represented Senegal at the 2019 African Games held in Rabat, Morocco. She competed in the women's 50 metre backstroke, women's 50 metre butterfly and women's 50 metre freestyle events.

References

1998 births
Living people
Senegalese female swimmers
Place of birth missing (living people)
Swimmers at the 2019 African Games
African Games competitors for Senegal
Female backstroke swimmers
Female butterfly swimmers
Senegalese female freestyle swimmers